La Jara is a comarca located in the Montes de Toledo at the western end of Toledo Province, it also includes the municipality of Anchuras, an enclave of the  province of Ciudad Real, in Castile-La Mancha, Spain. The comarca's capital is Los Navalucillos, however Talavera de la Reina is an important city for local people in La Jara owing to historical ties, even though it is located outside of the comarca.

This comarca has been traditionally a place of cattle rearers, with some honey production as well. Nowadays the economy has diversified and the comarca has suffered population loss. 

The Vía Verde de La Jara is an abandoned railway line that has been converted into a path for hikers.

Municipal terms and villages

Province of Toledo
 Alcaudete de la Jara
 Aldeanueva de Barbarroya
 Aldeanueva de San Bartolomé
 Belvís de la Jara
 El Campillo de la Jara
 Espinoso del Rey
 La Estrella
 Fuentes
 Las Herencias
 El Membrillo
 Mohedas de la Jara
 La Nava de Ricomalillo
 Los Navalmorales
 Los Navalucillos
 Los Alares
 Robledo del Buey
 Valdeazores
 La Pueblanueva
 Puerto de San Vicente
 Retamoso de la Jara
 Robledo del Mazo
 Las Hunfrías
 Navaltoril
 Piedraescrita
 Robledillo
 San Bartolomé de las Abiertas
 San Martín de Pusa
 Santa Ana de Pusa
 Sevilleja de la Jara
Buenasbodas
Gargantillas
Minas de Santa Quiteria 
Puerto del Rey
 Torrecilla de la Jara
 La Fresneda de la Jara
 Villarejo de Montalbán

Province of Ciudad Real
 Anchuras
 Encinacaída
 Enjambre
 Las Huertas
 Gamonoso

See also 
Montes de Toledo

References

External links 

La Comarca de la Jara
Toledo Tourism - Ruta por la Comarca de la Jara
Pueblos de La Jara
La Jara según Madoz

Jara
Jara
Jara